The sex hormone receptors, or sex steroid receptors, are a group of steroid hormone receptors that interact with the sex hormones, the androgens, estrogens, and progestogens, as well as with sex-hormonal agents such as anabolic steroids, progestins, and antiestrogens. They include the:

 Androgen receptor (AR) (A, B) - binds and is activated by androgens such as testosterone and dihydrotestosterone (DHT)
 Estrogen receptor (ER) (α, β) - binds and is activated by estrogens such as estradiol, estrone, and estriol
 Progesterone receptor (PR) (A, B) - binds and is activated by progestogens such as progesterone

In addition, sex steroids have been found to bind and activate membrane steroid receptors, such as estradiol and GPER.

See also
 Gonadotropin-releasing hormone receptor
 Gonadotropin receptor
 Steroid hormone receptor

References

Intracellular receptors
G protein-coupled receptors
Transcription factors